David Dempsey (Jan. 9, 1914 - Jan. 13, 1999) was an American writer best remembered for his book reviews and coverage of the publishing industry as a journalist.

Dempsey was born in Pekin, Illinois.  He married Evangeline Semon and they had a son, Ian.  The family lived in Rye, New York

During World War II Dempsey covered the American landings on four Pacific islands as a Marine Corps combat correspondent.

Dempsey wrote a weekly column, In and Out of Books, for The New York Times Book Review from 1949 - 1953, and a column on the publishing industry for The Saturday Review from 1963 to 1970.

Books

Nonfiction 
 U.S. Marines on Iwo Jima (1945) 
 Uncommon Valor: Marine Divisions in Action (1946)
 The Way We Die (1975)
 Psychology and You, with Philip Zimbardo (1978)

Novels 
 All That Was Mortal (Dutton; 1978)

References

1914 births
1999 deaths
People from Pekin, Illinois
American male journalists